St. Jude's or St. Judes may refer to:
Places
St. Jude's, Newfoundland and Labrador, Canada
St Jude's, Bristol, England
Churches
St. Jude's Church (disambiguation)
 St. Jude's Cathedral (disambiguation)
Schools
St. Jude's Elementary, Vancouver, Canada
St. Jude's Public School & Junior College, Kotagiri, India

Other
St Jude's GAA, a Gaelic Athletic Association club based in Templeogue, Dublin
St. Jude Children's Research Hospital
St. Jude Medical, an American medical device company

See also 
St. Jude (disambiguation)